This is a list of broadcast television stations that are licensed in the U.S. state of Oregon.

Full-power stations
VC refers to the station's PSIP virtual channel. RF refers to the station's physical RF channel.

Defunct full-power stations
Channel 3: KVDO-TV - Ind., PBS - Salem (2/24/1970-7/31/1983, moved to Bend, now KOAB-TV)
Channel 12: KLOR - ABC/DuMont, Ind. - Portland (3/8/1955-4/30/1957, merged with KPTV ch. 27)
Channel 27: KHTV - Portland (7/6/1959-11/1/1959)

LPTV stations

Translators

See also
 Lists of Oregon-related topics
 List of radio stations in Oregon

Oregon

Television